Diyorjon Turapov  (born 9 July 1994) is an Uzbekistani football midfielder currently playing for Navbahor Namangan in the Uzbekistan Professional Football League.

Career
He has played for Olmaliq FK since 2013.  He was a member of Uzbekistan under-20 football team at the 2013 FIFA U-20 World Cup. At the 2013 U-20 World Cup he scored the third goal of the game in a win against New Zealand.

On 29 May 2014 he made his debut for Uzbekistan in a friendly match against Oman which ended with a 0–1 win for Oman.

Honours
Lokomotiv
 Uzbekistan Super League (2) 2017, 2018
 Uzbek Cup (1) 2017
 Uzbekistan Super Cup 2019

References

External links
 

1994 births
Living people
Uzbekistani footballers
Uzbekistan international footballers
FC AGMK players
PFC Lokomotiv Tashkent players
Association football midfielders